The 2020 Hartford Hawks baseball team represented the University of Hartford in the 2020 NCAA Division I baseball season as a member of the America East Conference. The team was coached by Justin Blood and played their home games at Fiondella Field with select games being played at Dunkin' Donuts Park. The season was cut short due to the COVID-19 pandemic. On March 12, the NCAA announced all spring and winter sports championships were cancelled.

Roster

Schedule and results

References

Hartford
Hartford Hawks baseball
Hartford Hawks baseball seasons